Hochkamp railway station is on the Altona-Blankenese line and served by the city trains, located in Hamburg, Germany.

The rapid transit trains of the line S1 and the line S11 of the Hamburg S-Bahn calls the station in the quarter Nienstedten of the Altona borough in Hamburg. Right along the railway tracks is the border to the quarter Osdorf.

Station layout
The station is an elevated station with an island platform and 2 tracks. There is no service personnel attending the station, but an SOS and information telephone is available. There are about 20 places to lock a bicycle and about 70 park and ride places. The station is fully accessible for handicapped persons, because there is a lift. There are no lockerboxes.

Services
On track no. 1 the trains in direction Blankenese and Wedel and on track no. 2 the trains in direction Hamburg center and toward Poppenbüttel call the station. A bus stop in front of the railway station is called by a bus line.

See also

Hamburger Verkehrsverbund (HVV) (Public transport association in Hamburg)

References

External links
DB station information 
Network plan HVV (pdf) 560 KiB 

Hamburg S-Bahn stations in Hamburg
Buildings and structures in Altona, Hamburg
Hamburg Hochkamp
Hamburg Hochkamp